Eddie Hayes may refer to:
 Eddie Hayes (lawyer), Edward Hayes, (born c. 1947/48), American lawyer, journalist, and memoirist
 Eddie Hayes (rapper) (Edwin Hayes), American rap singer Aceyalone

See also
 Edward Hayes (disambiguation)